Richard Vetere (born January 15, 1952 in New York City) is an American playwright, screenwriter, television writer, poet and actor.

Career 

Born in 1952, Vetere grew up in Maspeth, Queens, a setting that appears in a number of his plays. He graduated from Columbia University with a master's degree in Comparative Literature and has written and published various books on poetry of which include Memories of Human Hands and A Dream of Angels.

Vetere's plays have been produced Off Broadway, regionally and internationally, such as The Engagement, Coupla Bimbos Sittin' Around Talkin, Gangster Apparel, Caravaggio, Machiavelli, and One Shot, One Kill and all have been published by Dramatic Publishing.  In 1983 his play Rockaway Boulevard was reviewed by Michiko Kakutani in The New York Times and she wrote,"Vetere demonstrates the ability to mix the poetic with the colloquial."

In 1983 Vetere's screenplay Vigilante was made into a feature film starring Robert Forster and Carol Lynley and was the 20th grossing film for that year.

In 1994 his play Hale the Hero! was aired on television by A&E General Motors Plays' Theater Series, starring Elisabeth Shue and Kevin Anderson with an introduction by Lauren Bacall

Vetere's Off Broadway production of The Marriage Fool was made into a CBS television movie starring Walter Matthau, Carol Burnett, John Stamos, and Teri Polo and it was the highest rated TV movie in 1998.  Then released in Europe under the title of Love After Death in 2004.  Veter's Off Broadway production of How To Go On A Date In Queens was made into a movie with a cast of comedic actors such as: Jason Alexander, Kimberly Willams, Ron Perlman, and Rob Estes.

Vetere has written for various TV series including Delaventura for CBS starring Danny Aiello, also as Story Editor onThreat Matrix for ABC and Disney, and sold a TV pilot The Wonder to CBS with Executive Producer George Clooney.

His novel The Third Miracle was published in hardcover in 1997 by Carroll & Graf and in paperback by Simon & Schuster and was translated into several languages.  The novel was selected for The Book of The Month Club in Spain and Poland.  Followed by a film produced by Francis Ford Coppola, directed by Agnieska Holland, starring Ed Harris and Anne Heche, released in April 2000.  In 2008 The Third Miracle was presented at the  Museum of Modern Art (MOMA) in New York City, highlighting Agnieszka Holland's body of directorial work.

Vetere has been a longtime member of the New York Playwrights Lab founded by Israel Horovitz in 1975.  Horovitz quoted in the Newsday that, "Vetere is a man with a writer's soul."

Vetere's professional teaching credits include NYU (A Master's Screenwriting), Queens College and Montclair State (An Introduction to Screenwriting), and created a playwright's class at The Lang College at The New School, along with participating in the Mentoring Program at Columbia University.

In 2005 Stony Brook University archived Vetere's works and letters from 1967 until 2001.

In October 2007, Vetere's musical Be My Love: The Mario Lanza Story, about the life of singer Mario Lanza, premiered at The Tilles Center for the Performing Arts in Greenvale, NY.  It was directed by Charles Messina and produced by Sonny Grosso and Phil Ramone.

In 2012, Richard Vetere was elected to the Writers Guild of America East as a Freelance Council Seat member and made a Lifetime Member of the WGA East.  His third volume of poetry The Other Colors in a Snow Storm was just published by Bordighera Press.  His new play Last Day was produced at Gloucester Stage and his play Caravaggio was translated into Italian and produced in Rome, Porto Ercole and Capri.  His young adult play Bird Brain was recently published and he performed his one-person story-telling Love the Night at DR Lounge.

He also was artist in residence at Culture Project in the summer of 2012 for IMPACT 2012.

He wrote a book, The Writers Afterlife, that was published by Three Rooms Press in 2014.
His play The Kids Menu made into a movie starring Vincent Pastore.
His new novel is Champagne and Cocaine published by Three Rooms Press set in NYC in 1981.

References

External links
 https://web.archive.org/web/20130603224609/http://www.stonybrook.edu/libspecial/collections/manuscripts/vetere.shtml
 http://www1.cuny.edu/forum/?p=1805

1952 births
Living people
20th-century American dramatists and playwrights
Columbia Graduate School of Arts and Sciences alumni
People from Maspeth, Queens
Writers from Queens, New York
Novelists from New York (state)
20th-century American novelists
21st-century American dramatists and playwrights
21st-century American novelists
American male dramatists and playwrights
American male novelists
20th-century American male writers
21st-century American male writers